Wakiso is a city in the Central Region of Uganda. It is the headquarters of Wakiso District.

Location
The coordinates of the town are 00 24 00N, 32 28 48E (Latitude:0.4000; Longitude:32.4800).

Climate
Köppen-Geiger climate classification system classifies its climate as tropical rainforest (Af).

Population
According to available national census records, Wakiso Town Council had a population of 21,096 in 1969. By the 1980 national census, the population ha grown to 21,289. In 1991, the population of the town was enumerated at 1,777 people.

In 2002, the census that year, enumerated the population at 20,073 and in 2014, that year's census put the population of Wakiso Town at 60,210.

In 2015, the Uganda Bureau of Statistics (UBOS) estimated the population of the town at 63,500. In 2020, the population agency estimated the mid-year population at 87,900 people. Of these, 46,600 (53 percent) were females and 41,300 (47 percent) were males. UBOS calculated that the population of Wakiso Town expanded at an average rate of 6.7 percent annually, between 2015 and 2020.

Points of interest
The following points of interest are found in Wakiso or close to the town's borders: (a) the headquarters of Wakiso District Administration (b) the offices of Wakiso Town Council (c) Wakiso Central Market and (d) Bunamwaya Stadium, a 5,000-seat stadium and home to the Vipers SC soccer club.

The Kampala–Hoima Highway passes through the middle of town in a general northwest/southeast direction.

See also
 List of cities and towns in Uganda

References

External links
 Government Considering Satellite Cities For Wakiso As of 31 March 2019.

Populated places in Central Region, Uganda
Cities in the Great Rift Valley
Wakiso District